The 2015 Syed Modi International Grand Prix Gold was the second grand prix gold and grand prix tournament of the 2015 BWF Grand Prix Gold and Grand Prix. The tournament was held in Babu Banarasi Das Indoor Stadium, Lucknow, India from 20 January until 25 January 2015 and had a total purse of $120,000.

Men's singles

Seeds

Finals

Top half

Section 1

Section 2

Section 3

Section 4

Bottom half

Section 5

Section 6

Section 7

Section 8

Women's singles

Seeds

Finals

Top half

Section 1

Section 2

Bottom half

Section 3

Section 4

Men's doubles

Seeds

  Mathias Boe / Carsten Mogensen (champion)
  Mads Conrad-Petersen / Mads Pieler Kolding (quarter-final)
  Danny Bawa Chrisnanta / Chayut Triyachart (second round)
  Vladimir Ivanov / Ivan Sozonov (final)
  Manu Attri / Sumeeth Reddy Buss (semi-final)
  Pranav Chopra / Akshay Dewalkar (semi-final)
  Wannawat Ampunsuwan / Patiphat Chalardchaleam (withdrew)
  Hoon Thien How / Tan Boon Heong (withdrew)

Finals

Top half

Section 1

Section 2

Bottom half

Section 3

Section 4

Women's doubles

Seeds

  Vivian Hoo Kah Mun / Woon Khe Wei (final)
  Jwala Gutta / Ashwini Ponnappa (semi-final)
  Puttita Supajirakul / Sapsiree Taerattanachai (semi-final)
  Amelia Alicia Anscelly / Soong Fie Cho (champion)

Finals

Top half

Section 1

Section 2

Bottom half

Section 3

Section 4

Mixed doubles

Seeds

Finals

Top half

Section 1

Section 2

Bottom half

Section 3

Section 4

References
tournamentsoftware.com

Syed Modi International Badminton Championships
India
Open Grand Prix Gold
India Open Grand Prix Gold
Sport in Lucknow